We Sing Down Under is a 2011 karaoke game part of the We Sing family of games, developed by French studio Le Cortex. The game features 100% Australian artists and is set to only be released in the Australian PAL territory.

Gameplay
The gameplay is similar to the SingStar set of video games. Players are required to sing along with music in order to score points, matching pitch and rhythm. The game has anticheat technology whereby tapping or humming will register on the screen but no points will be awarded. We Sing Down Under also contains the addition of 'Star Notes' that allow the player to score even more points by matching the pitch and rhythm of certain hard to score parts of songs.

 30 full licensed songs with music videos where available
 Solo Mode
 Multiplayer modes - Group Battle, We Sing, Versus, Pass the Mic, First to X, Expert, Blind, Marathon.
 Real Karaoke mode
 Jukebox mode
 Singing Lessons
 Award System
 Customisable backgrounds
 Four Microphones
 Integrates with a USB hub

Due to hardware limitations with the Wii only having two USB ports, a USB hub is shipped with certain retail sku's to add more USB ports. The game uses the standard logitech USB microphone for the Wii.

Track List

Current lists of songs that have been announced via the We Sing Facebook page, press releases and screenshots. The entire track list for We Sing Down Under was announced on March 31 with the launch of the game in Australia.

Christine Anu - My Island Home
Daddy Cool - Eagle Rock
Delta Goodrem - Born to Try
Divinyls - I Touch Myself
Evermore - Light Surrounding You
Faker - This Heart Attack
Gabriella Cilmi - Sweet About Me
Gina G - (Ooh Ah) Just A Little Bit
Guy Sebastian - Like It Like That
Jimmy Barnes - No Second Prize
John Paul Young - Love Is In The Air
Kasey Chambers - Not Pretty Enough
Kate Miller-Heidke - The Last Day On Earth
Leonardo's Bride - Even When I'm Sleeping
Men at Work - Down Under
Mental As Anything - Live It Up
Natalie Imbruglia - Torn
Olivia Newton-John - Physical
Rogue Traders - Voodoo Child
Rolf Harris - Tie Me Kangaroo Down, Sport
Savage Garden - Truly Madly Deeply
Slim Dusty - Waltzing Matilda
Shannon Noll - What About Me
The Choirboys - Run to Paradise
The Potbelleez - Don't Hold Back
Tina Arena - Chains
The Veronicas - Hook Me Up
The Vines - Get Free
Wendy Matthews - The Day You Went Away
The Whitlams - No Aphrodisiac

Peripherals

Due to hardware limitations with the Wii only having two USB ports, a USB hub is shipped with certain retail sku's to add more USB ports. The game uses the standard Logitech USB microphone for the Wii.

See also
We Sing
We Sing Encore
We Sing Robbie Williams
SingStar
Karaoke Revolution
Lips

References

External links 
We Sing Website

2011 video games
Karaoke video games
Multiplayer and single-player video games
Music video games
THQ Nordic games
Video games developed in France
We Sing
Wii games
Wii-only games
Wired Productions games